Rusty Jacobs (born July 10, 1967, in New York City) is an American former film actor. Jacobs is known for appearing in films such as Once Upon a Time in America and Taps.

He was a reporter for North Carolina Public Radio. He is currently an Assistant District Attorney in North Carolina.

Filmography

References

External links

1967 births
American male film actors
American male television actors
Living people